Eugenia Paulicelli is a professor of Italian Studies, Comparative Literature, and Women’s Studies at Queens College and The Graduate Center, CUNY. She is also the founder and director of the Fashion Studies Program at The Graduate Center.

Paulicelli writes the column “Fashionology” for La Voce di New York, is a member of the advisory board for Women’s Studies Quarterly, and is on the editorial board of the academic journal Fashion, Film and Consumption. As an author, she is largely collected by libraries worldwide.

Biography
Eugenia Paulicelli received her laurea from the University of Bari, Italy, in semiotics and literary studies. After completing her PhD in Italian and French at the University of Wisconsin–Madison, she taught in the Department of Italian Studies at Wellesley College in Massachusetts. She joined the faculty at Queens College in 1992 as a professor in the Department of Romance Languages. In 1999, she was appointed to the PhD Program in Comparative Literature and, in 2002, she was appointed to the Women’s Studies Certificate Program, also at The Graduate Center, CUNY.

Paulicelli’s scholarly work is wide-ranging and interdisciplinary. Her research focuses on visual and material culture, and the relationship in literature, media, film, and fashion between the word and the image. Her research in Fashion Studies examines how fashion functions as an industry and as a symbolic force, mediated across time and space.  She has taught courses on fashion cultures, film and screen media, Italian literature, and national identity.

Additionally, she has curated several exhibitions including "The Fabric of Cultures: Fashion, Identity, Globalization," which was held at the Godwin-Ternbach Museum at Queens College in 2006 and traveled to the Museum of Craft and Folk Art in San Francisco in 2008. In 2010, she curated “Fashion + Film: The 1960s Revisited” held at the James Gallery at The Graduate Center, CUNY, and also in 2010 co-curated the New York edition of the “Birds of Paradise” film festival from Saint Martin's School of Art, London. In 2012, she curated a film series at the Museum of the Moving Image celebrating the centenary of Michelangelo Antonioni’s birth.

She is a guest professor in the Fashion Studies PhD program at The University of Stockholm was awarded the Benjamin Meaker Visiting Professorship at the University of Bristol in 2013.

Paulicelli lives in Madison, Connecticut with her husband, Dr. David Ward, who is also an Italian Professor at Wellesley College. They have one daughter, Anna, (born 1998) who attended Trinity College in Hartford, Connecticut.

Bibliography
 The Fabric of Cultures: Systems in the Making, QCArtCenter, City University of New York, 2017,  / 978-8826494876.
 Italian Style: Fashion & Film from Early Cinema to the Digital Age, Bloomsbury Academic, 2016,  / 978-1441189158.
 Rosa Genoni: Fashion is a Serious Business / La moda é una cosa seria, Italy: Deleyva Editore, 2015
 Writing Fashion in Early Modern Italy: From Sprezzatura to Satire, Routledge, 2014, 
 The Fabric of Cultures: Fashion, Identity, and Globalization, Routledge, 2009,  / 9780415775427
 Fashion under Fascism: Beyond the Black Shirt, Bloomsbury Academic / Berg Publishers, 2004,

References

External links 
 Eugenia Paulicelli - Bio at The Graduate Center, CUNY
 Eugenia Paulicelli - Bio at Queens College
 Eugenia Paulicelli - Interview with Vogue Italia
 Eugenia Paulicelli - Fashionology column in La Voce di New York

Fashion historians
Living people
Graduate Center, CUNY faculty
1958 births
Italian emigrants to the United States